The , nicknamed HYBARI, is a hydrogen fuel cell electric multiple unit (EMU) train type operated by East Japan Railway Company (JR East) from 2022.

This series will be used as a test unit to collect data for future development and deployment of fuel cell vehicles. Starting in 2021, JR East will conduct trials on the Tsurumi and Nambu lines and expects to have the technology ready for commercial application by 2024. On 4 June 2020, the company announced that it would invest ¥4 billion into the development of this series, which is the new generation of the Fuel Cell New Energy Train experimental unit.

The FV acronym (of the series numbering: FV-E991) stands for Fuel cell Vehicle and the E for East (because this series is to be operated by East Japan Railway Company). This series nickname HYBARI stands for "HYdrogen-HYBrid Advanced Rail vehicle for Innovation".

Fuel cell system 
This series is equipped with a hybrid system that uses hydrogen as fuel and an electric battery as a power source. It works by generating electricity with compressed hydrogen (stored in the train) and oxygen (from the air). Electricity is then stored on batteries that is to power the electric motors and other systems of the train. Fuel cell vehicles only emit water and heat, so they are considered zero-emission vehicles (ZEV).

The trailer car has the hydrogen storage units installed on the roof. There are 4 carbon fiber banks, each with five  modules. There are two pumping units, one on the roof (near the hydrogen storage unit) and the other one under the floor (near the fuel cell device) to pump hydrogen from the banks to the fuel cell device. The fuel cell device has two 180 kW polymer fuel cell stacks installed under the floor. The batteries power a VVVF converter with twin inverters to feed the four  traction motors. The series is equipped with regenerative brakes, which charge the batteries during braking. Toyota Motor Corporation developed the fuel cell device, while Hitachi developed the hybrid system.

Design 
Based on the design of the EV-E301 series battery electric multiple unit, the design of the train conveys a sense of speed and give a futuristic image. The train is painted in a blue splash pattern to represent the moistening of the earth and the water generated from the fuel cell device.
The train has the HYBARI logo on the front and another on the side in the middle of the train, on a side of the junction between cars. This logo is to represent the introduction of new energy for vehicles as the breath of spring onto the land.

Goals

Contributing to reduce carbon dioxide emissions 
The main goal of this project is to create a rolling stock that operates using clean energy, such as hydrogen, to minimize the environmental impact. Hydrogen does not emit carbon dioxide or any other polluting substance to the atmosphere and can be produced using renewable energy. This will help to curb global warming and to diversify energy sources.

Collaboration to develop hybrid fuel cell vehicles 
Combining JR East's railway rolling stock design and manufacturing, Hitachi's railway hybrid systems, and Toyota's technologies used to develop the Mirai fuel cell electric automobile and SORA fuel cell bus, those three companies will adapt fuel cells for the railway industry. They will try to create hybrid fuel cell rolling stock, which needs a higher power output than cars and buses.

Operations 
This series is scheduled to operate on the following lines by March 2022 as a test unit:
Tsurumi Line
Nambu Main Line ( - )
Nambu Line Shitte branch line

Formation 
The FV-E991 series unit was delivered from the Japan Transport Engineering Company (J-TREC) factory in Yokohama in February 2022. It is formed as follows, consisting of two cars.

See also 

 NE Train, an experimental railcar used by JR East to test alternative power sources
 Hydrail
 Fuel cell vehicle
 Fuel cell
 Hydrogen vehicle

External links 
 JR East website
 Toyota website

References 

East Japan Railway Company
Train-related introductions in 2022

Electric multiple units of Japan
Fuel cell vehicles
Hydrogen rolling stock
J-TREC multiple units